"Upper Middle Class White Trash" is a song recorded by American country music artist Lee Brice. It was released in July 2008 alongside Four on the Floor as the third single from his EP, Picture of Me.

Critical reception
Matt Bjorke of Roughstock gave the song a mixed review, saying that 
The writer of Garth Brooks’ #1 hit “More Than A Memory” sells himself a bit short going for honky-tonk humor above a song that dares to reveal society’s judgments on class. Three verses basically chronicle the “ah-ha!” value of Five Man Electrical Band/Tesla’s “Signs” and crutch the “white trash” banner as a reason to exploit the audience on this appealing, but predictable tune that was better on television four decades ago than as a rushed single in 2008."

Chart performance

References

See also
White trash
Upper middle class in the United States

2008 songs
2008 singles
Lee Brice songs
Curb Records singles
Songs written by Lee Brice
Song recordings produced by Doug Johnson (record producer)